Arturo Romeo (born 20 October 1941) is a Filipino former cyclist. He competed in the individual road race and team time trial events at the 1964 Summer Olympics.

References

External links
 

1941 births
Living people
Filipino male cyclists
Olympic cyclists of the Philippines
Cyclists at the 1964 Summer Olympics
Place of birth missing (living people)
Cyclists at the 1966 Asian Games
Asian Games competitors for the Philippines